The Cathedral of the Nativity of Our Lady also Sé Catedral da Natividade de Nossa Senhora and Igreja da Sé is a Roman Catholic cathedral in Sé, Macau. It is the current cathedral of the Diocese of Macau. The cathedral is also called the "Church of the Nativity of Our Lady".

The cathedral is included in the list of historical monuments of the Historic Centre of Macau, which in turn is included in the list of World Heritage Sites in China.

History
1623
In the early seventeenth century it was a small wooden chapel, and was elevated to cathedral only in 1623. Before 1623, the Diocese was headquartered in the St. Lazarus' Church.

1850
The first cathedral built in stone, consecrated in 1850 by the then Bishop of Macau, Jerónimo José da Mata, was almost destroyed in a typhoon 24 years later, after having undergone major repairs.

1937
The cathedral was completely rebuilt in concrete in 1937, costing approximately 100,900 patacas.

Cathedral Clergy
Cathedral Dean: Bishop Stephen Lee
Assistant Priests: Fr. Daniel Antonio de Carvalho Ribeiro SCJ
Assistant Priests: Fr. Cyril Jerome Law Jr.

Service area
The service area of the cathedral is the second largest parish in the Peninsula of Macau, including New Road, South Bay and Outer Harbour Terminals in the lobby area.

See also
 Religion in Macau

References

Roman Catholic cathedrals in Macau
Historic Centre of Macau
Catholic Church in Macau
Portuguese Macau
Roman Catholic churches completed in 1937
1623 in Asia
Sé, Macau
20th-century Roman Catholic church buildings in China